The Latin Grammy Award for Best Rock Solo Vocal Album was an honor presented annually at the Latin Grammy Awards, a ceremony conducted by the Latin Academy of Recording Arts & Sciences to "recognize excellence and create a wider awareness of the cultural diversity" and contributions of Latin recording artists in the United States and internationally. According to the category description guide for the 2009 Latin Grammy Awards, the award was given to vocal rock, hard rock or metal albums containing at least 51 percent of newly recorded material. It was given to a male or female artist.

The award was first presented at the Latin Grammy Awards of 2001. Before its introduction, the rock categories were separated by gender and ensembles, with an additional award for Best Rock Album. At the Latin Grammy Awards of 2010 two rock categories were presented, Rock Album and Best Rock Song. No information was released regarding the absence or possible withdrawal of the Best Rock Solo Vocal Album category.

Argentinian artists have won the award more times than any other nationality. Colombian singer-songwriter Juanes has won the most awards in the category, with three wins out of the same number of nominations. Mexican performers Alejandra Guzmán and Julieta Venegas are the only female singers to be awarded. Fito Páez and Luis Alberto Spinetta are the most nominated performers, with four nominations each. Draco Rosa became the last recipient of the award in 2009, for the album Teatro.

Recipients

Notes 
 Each year is linked to the article about the Latin Grammy Awards held that year.
 The nationality of the performing artist(s).
 The name of the performer and the nominated album

See also
 Grammy Award for Best Solo Rock Vocal Performance

References

External links
Official site of the Latin Grammy Awards

 
Awards disestablished in 2009
Awards established in 2001
Rock Solo Vocal Album